Aurélien Mazel (born 24 November 1982) was a French professional football player. He has recently retired from football. He had been most recently playing for Scottish part-time club Stirling Albion.

He played on the professional level in Ligue 1 for Toulouse FC and in Ligue 2 for Toulouse and LB Châteauroux.

He played one game in the 2004–05 UEFA Cup for Châteauroux.

References

External links
 
 

1982 births
Living people
French footballers
French expatriate footballers
Expatriate footballers in Belgium
Ligue 1 players
Ligue 2 players
Toulouse FC players
LB Châteauroux players
AS Cannes players
US Colomiers Football players
Stirling Albion F.C. players
Footballers from Toulouse
Scottish Professional Football League players
Association football defenders